Bob's Red Mill is an American brand of whole-grain foods marketed by employee-owned American company Bob's Red Mill Natural Foods of Milwaukie, Oregon. The company was established in 1978 by Bob and Charlee Moore.

Bob's Red Mill Natural Foods is a producer of natural, certified organic, and gluten-free milled grain products, billing itself as the "nation's leading miller of diverse whole-grain foods." Its products are distributed throughout the United States, Canada, and a number of other locations such as the Caribbean. It produces over 400 products, primarily whole grains that are ground with quartz millstones which come from several 120-year-old mills, as well as baking mixes, beans, seeds, nuts, dried fruits, spices, and herbs. They are sold through seventy natural food and specialty grocery distributors in the United States and Canada, their online store, and the company's factory store and restaurant.

History

Moore's beginning as a business owner was in gasoline, not grains. In the 1950s, he briefly owned a filling station in Los Angeles. The smog in the city influenced Bob and his wife Charlee to sell the station, and move to Mammoth Lakes, a small resort town in the mountains just to the north of Los Angeles where he opened a second gas station. It failed after a year and the family was forced to move temporarily into a rental owned by their minister. Moore got a job working as a manager at a Firestone Tires store and got back on his feet. He bought a five-acre goat farm where he and Charlee raised their boys.  He and his sons sold milk and eggs locally. Charlee began experimenting with baking whole grain bread.

Moore's drive for healthier foods started with his father's death of a heart attack at age 49, and his grandmother's healthy eating obsession.

He began experimenting with stone-ground flours in the mid-1960s after reading "John Goffe's Mill," a book about an archeologist who rebuilt a flour mill and went into business with no prior experience. Stone grinding, largely abandoned when the flour industry moved to steel rollers, used quartz millstones that operate at lower temperatures and blend the germ, its oil, the bran, and the endosperm, preserving the nutrition in the grains.  He found his first traditional stone-grinding flour millstones from a company in North Carolina while he was working, at the time, for JCPenney. The equipment sat for a few years until Moore, his wife, and two of his three sons started their first mill business, Moore's Flour Mill in Redding, California.

Bob and his wife retired from the Redding Mill and left one of his sons to run it. That mill still produces some products under contract with Moore's current company.  The Moores moved to Portland, where Bob attended a seminary to study the Bible for about six months.  Bob found a commercial flour mill in Oregon City that was for sale, painted it red, and went back into the flours business.  Moore bought mill stones from the closed Boyd mill near Dufur, Oregon. He acquired other stones from old mills in Indiana and Tennessee. The business that is now Bob's Red Mill began producing stone ground flours and cereals for the local area. In 1978, Moore sold direct through his store until he made a deal with the Fred Meyer grocery stores to carry his products 

In 1988, annual sales to area health food stores and smaller grocers were approaching $3 million when the original mill was destroyed by an arsonist's fire. The stones were spared from the fire. Grain from the second floor fell on them in the fire which extinguished the flames around the mills themselves, keeping the quartz stones from shattering in the heat, and preserving the gears that turned them.

The company built a new mill in Milwaukie, Oregon, after Moore was flown around the state by friends unsuccessful in finding an existing mill that would do. The couple borrowed $2.5M to rebuild the factory and warehouse in a new 60,000 sq. ft. facility. Bob continued to grow the business by working with small markets, local retail and larger wholesale customers, rather than a corporate approach. The Moores were early to the whole grains movement, when other suppliers were making more money by making faster, cheaper products. They also were one of the first gluten-free mills in 1991, and one of the first to offer specialty grains and cereals in retail-sized packaging. They were also one of the first flour mills to build labs that tested their products to certify organic and gluten-free compliance.

In 1996, the Moores took on partners to expand and pay off their debt. Dennis Gilliam, who came from the printing business, became their vice-president of sales and marketing.  John Wagner became vice-president of administration. Gilliam expanded the company wholesaling with California-based Quality Brokerage and Nature's Best, the company's first large regional distributors.

Wagner helped the company control debt by building  and repairing machinery in-house, and through the purchasing of used machinery needed for expansion from older and closed mills like Seattle-based Fisher Mills, Inc.

In 2005, it was estimated that Bob's Red Mill's annual revenue was between US$30 million and $50 million.

In June 2007, the company announced that it was moving both its administrative headquarters, and manufacturing and warehousing facility to a  building from its original  facility, which it planned to sell and sub-lease. The new facility will triple the company's manufacturing capacity.

As of 2005, its products were available in Japan and the company intends to expand distribution to other countries.

In February 2010, owner Bob Moore transferred ownership of the company to his employees using an employee stock ownership plan.

Philanthropy

In 2011, the Moores donated $5 million to Oregon State University to develop a center to study whole grains and over $1 million to a local naturopathic college, both for the study of childhood obesity.

References

Further reading
 Article from Portland Business Journal, November 26, 1999
 Article from Portland Business Journal, November 14, 2002

External links

How I Built This– "Bob's Red Mill: Bob Moore" (audio interview)

1978 establishments in Oregon
Baking mixes
Companies based in Milwaukie, Oregon
Food and drink companies established in 1978
Food manufacturers of the United States
Privately held companies based in Oregon